Der Bulle von Tölz is a German television series which has been produced and broadcast by Sat.1 since 1996. As of January 2009, 69 self-contained feature-length episodes have been made.

Genre

Set in Bad Tölz, Bavaria, the series is about the activities of the local Kriminalpolizei as personified by Benno Berghammer (Ottfried Fischer), the eponymous Bulle (literally "bull", a slang word and the equivalent of "cop" but at the same time an allusion to his bulky appearance), and Sabrina Lorenz (Katerina Jacob), two Kommissare who invariably, at the beginning of each episode, are faced with murder in the seemingly idyllic small town of Bad Tölz or its rural surroundings.

Generally, no violence is shown, and although the plot is always well constructed and the murder cases are always plausible and realistic, the huge popularity of the show is due to the underlying comedy which pervades each episode. Thus, most adult viewers derive more pleasure from the constellation of characters and the many running gags and one-liners delivered throughout the show than from following the plot or guessing who the murderer is. The fact that much of the dialogue is performed in Bavarian German equally lends familiarity to the characters.

Recurring characters

In episode #1, Benno Berghammer is in his early forties. An only child and heavily overweight, he still lives with his widowed mother, Resi Berghammer (Ruth Drexel), who is running a small bed and breakfast in Bad Tölz. Berghammer takes it for granted that his mother cooks for him (twice a day: he even returns home for lunch whenever possible) and that she washes his clothes and tidies up his room but there is hardly anything he gives her in return. While she is proud of her son and his achievements at his job, Resi Berghammer does not approve of his celibate lifestyle. Longing for a grandchild, she occasionally dabbles in matchmaking when she becomes aware of an eligible female. But although her son has a penchant for attractive female suspects he never gets involved with any women. Generally, there is constant bickering between mother and son over all sorts of things big and small.

Sabrina Lorenz is a young Kommissarin hailing from Berlin. Single and unattached, she at first has a hard time adapting to Bavarian customs and also to the language: Not always able to understand, let alone speak, Bavarian dialect, Lorenz is immediately recognized as a Zugereiste, which is hardly an advantage. However, she knows what she wants and is good at her job, and forms a perfect team with Berghammer (whom she occasionally teases for his set ways).

Nadine Richter, played by Katharina Abt,  replaced Sabrina Lorenz in 2006.

Other recurring characters include Wachtmeister Anton Pfeiffer (Udo Thomer), a clumsy and slightly idiotic uniformed policeman; Toni Rambold (Gerd Anthoff), an old schoolmate of Berghammer's who has become a (rather shady) entrepreneur in the construction business and who represents capitalism in the series; and Prälat Hinter (Michael Lerchenberg), the local Roman Catholic priest.

Actor Udo Thomer died in the first week of January 2006.
Following the death of actress Ruth Drexel in February 2009 SAT1 announced, to probably not produce any more new episodes of "Der Bulle von Tölz".

Topics

In Der Bulle von Tölz, a fair amount of social criticism is presented in a humorous way. For example, double standards of morality are frequently thematized (the Catholic Church doing business with shady land developers and thus potentially harming the environment; members of the clergy associating with prostitutes; Bavaria's political élite—invariably CSU— hypocritically claiming they only want what is best for the citizens; etc.). Also, current fads (the Internet craze, valuable antiques, Feng Shui, cosmetic surgery, etc.) are often taken up. Finally, several murder cases revolve around traditional subjects (rivalry between farmers, poaching, sports events, class reunions, etc.).

External links
 Site at SAT.1 

1996 German television series debuts
2009 German television series endings
German crime television series
1990s German police procedural television series
2000s German police procedural television series
German drama television series
Television shows set in Bavaria
German-language television shows
Sat.1 original programming